Wazalendo Savings and Credit Cooperative Society (WSACCO), also referred to as Wazalendo Sacco, is a savings and credit co-operative society in Uganda. It is an institutional Sacco composed of Uganda People's Defence Force (UPDF) personnel and their families, UPDF Reserve Forces, and staff of Uganda's Ministry of Defence. WSACCO is affiliated with the Uganda Co-operative Savings and Credit Union Limited and with the Uganda Co-operative Alliance.

Overview
WSACCO was established on 22 September 2005 with initial savings of about US$96,000 (UGX:238 million). Membership is restricted to persons in active service with the UPDF and their families, UPDF veterans and their families, and staff of the Ministry of Defence in Uganda and their families. The main objective is to mobilize savings and make loans to members at reasonable interest rates to improve their welfare. WSACCO adopted “Save for the Future Development” as its slogan. By 30 June 2011, 61,482 members had joined. By February 2012, membership had increased to  65,741 and total savings were valued at approximately US$9.23 million (UGX:23 billion), making WSACCO the largest savings credit union in Uganda.  the WSACCO's total assets were valued at approximately US$43.7 million (UGX:109 billion) with shareholders' equity of about US$30.1 million (UGX:75 billion) and a loan portfolio estimated at  US$35 million (UGX:87 billion).

As of December 2014, the WSACCO's membership had increased to over 73,000. Shareholders equity stood at USh67.4 billion (US$23.4 million). Total assets were valued at USh131.1 billion (US$45.5 million). The total loan book stood at USh116.3 billion (US$40.4 million). WSACCO made after-tax profits of USh9.5 billion (US$3.3 million), for the calendar year ending 31 December 2014.

As of 31 December 2021, the Sacco's membership exceeded 91,000. Total assets were UGX:630.7 billion (US$176.3 mullion). Shareholders' equity was UGX:219.8 billion (US$61.4 million). The Sacco's total loan book at that time was UGX:484.4 billion (US$135.4 million). WSACCO made after-tax profit of UGX:54.9 billion (US$15.3 million) in calendar year 2021.

Branch network
, WSACCO maintained the following branches:
	
 Achol-pii Branch -  Achol-pii
 Arua Branch - Arua UPDF Barracks
 Head Office - Bombo UPDF Barracks
 Bombo Branch - Bombo
 Entebbe Branch - Entebbe
 Gulu Branch - Gulu
 Jinja Branch - Jinja
 Kakiri Banch - Kakiri
 Kotido Branch - Nakaprimoli, Kotido District*
 Masaka Branch - Masaka
 Masindi Branch - Masindi
 Mbale Branch - Mbale
 Mbarara Branch - Mbarara
 Moroto Banch - Moroto
 Mubende Branch - Mubende
 Muhooti Branch - Muhooti
 Nakasongola Branch - Nakasongola UPDF Air Base
 Ssingo Branch - Kaweweeta, Nakaseke District
 Mogadishu Branch - Somalia

(*) = Non-Networked branches

Governance
As of March 2022, the Board of Directors of the society included the following:

 Board Members
 Chairman - Major General Sam Kavuma 
 Vice Chairman - Lieutenant Colonel Allan Kitanda
 Treasurer - Lieutenant Colonel Benon Kato
 Member Central - Captain Isaac Bisaalu
 Member Gender -  Major Mariam Kagoro
 Member Western - Captain Dathan Bunanukye
 Member Eastern - Captain Norah Ongodia
 Member Northern - Major Peter Tuhairwe
 Member West Nile - Staff Sergeant Peter Osuko

SUPCO Members
 Chairman SUPCO - Brigadier Simon Ocan
 Vice Chairman SUPCO - Colonel Justus Rukundo
 Secretary SUPCO - Major Alexander Asiimwe.

See also

References

External links

Banks established in 2005
2005 establishments in Uganda
Luweero District
Credit unions of Uganda
Uganda People's Defence Force